Russian dressing is a piquant American salad dressing consisting of mayonnaise, ketchup, and other ingredients.

Russian dressing is similar to Thousand Island. Some manufactured versions omit the mayonnaise and are clear rather than creamy, more similar to French or Catalina.

History
Russian dressing is mentioned as early as 1900 in U.S. sources. It is also documented in a 1910 catering book as an alternative to vinaigrette for dressing tomatoes or asparagus. A 1913 cookbook has a recipe which is a vinaigrette with paprika and mustard. A mayonnaise-based recipe is documented in 1914. The condiment came to be called "Russian" since the original recipe included caviar, a staple of Russian cuisine.  

Local historians claim that the mayonnaise-based version was invented in Nashua, New Hampshire, by James E. Colburn in the 1910s. A 1927 biographical article calls him "the originator and first producer of that delectable condiment known as Russian salad dressing". Colburn had been selling "Colburn's Mayonnaise salad dressing" at his store since at least 1910.

By 1914, Colburn's company was manufacturing it, and distributing it to retailers and hotels. He earned enough from its sale that he retired in 1924.

Preparation
Typically piquant, it is today characteristically made of a blend of mayonnaise and ketchup complemented with such additional ingredients as horseradish, pimentos, chives, mustard, and spices.

Uses
Besides being used as a salad dressing, Russian dressing is also used as a spread for Reuben sandwiches.

Related sauces
Russian dressing has largely been supplanted by Thousand Island dressing, which is sweeter and less spicy than Russian.

Other combinations of mayonnaise and ketchup, but without the spicy ingredients, are known as fry sauce or other names, and typically served with French fries or tostones.

In Australia, sauce made from mayonnaise and ketchup is called Cocktail Sauce and is used to dress prawns/shrimp in the appetiser known as Prawn Cocktail.

Tartar sauce has the piquant ingredients of Russian dressing, without the ketchup. It is typically served with fried fish.

Marie Rose sauce is similar to Russian dressing, but with different piquant ingredients. It is typically served with seafood.

A variant known as red Russian dressing is very much like Catalina or French dressing.

In Germany, a similar salad dressing is called "American dressing".

References

External links
Historical definitions and recipes for Russian dressing

Salad dressings
Mayonnaise
Spreads (food)
1900 introductions
American condiments
Horseradish (condiment)
Ketchup